Bala Jir Kuh (also Romanized as Bālā Jīr Kūh; also known as Jīr Kūh) is a village in Sakht Sar Rural District, in the Central District of Ramsar County, Mazandaran Province, Iran. At the 2006 census, its population was 21, in 7 families.

References 

Populated places in Ramsar County